Kitzingen is a town in the German state of Bavaria, capital of the district Kitzingen. It is part of the Franconia geographical region and has around 21,000 inhabitants. Surrounded by vineyards, Kitzingen County is the largest wine producer in Bavaria. It is said to be Franconia's wine trade center.

History

According to legend, Kitzingen was founded when the Countess of Schwanberg lost her jeweled scarf while standing on the ramparts of her castle. The castle was located high above the fertile section of the Main Valley where Kitzingen now lies. The Countess promised to build a cloister on the spot where the scarf was found. When it was found by a shepherd named Kitz, she kept her word and built a cloister which she called Kitzingen. That Benedictine cloister, founded in the 8th century on the site of the present town of Kitzingen, defended the ford across the river Main.

Kitzingen's history is closely tied to Würzburg. Kitzingen became a free imperial city around the year 1000. During the next century the town changed rulers often, mostly being ruled by Würzburg prince-bishops who sold the town twice to fill their empty treasury.

In 1629, Prince-Bishop Philipp Adolf von Ehrenberg of Würzburg took up his option to repurchase Kitzingen after the Peasants' Revolt in 1525. He abolished Protestantism and forced more than 1,000 residents to leave the town. This blow to the town's strength was followed by the Swedish three-year occupation during the Thirty Years' War.

Kitzingen's revival is credited to the wisdom of Prince-Bishop Johann Philipp von Schönborn of Würzburg, whose Edict of Toleration in 1650 encouraged the return of the expelled Protestants. This is why both Catholicism and Protestantism are present in Kitzingen today.

The resulting prosperity carried Kitzingen through the 18th century as one of the most important ports on the Main. Kitzingen's life under the Prince-Bishops ended with the coming of French revolutionary armies and Napoleon.

In 1814 the Congress of Vienna confirmed Kitzingen's passing, along with the rest of the region, to the Kingdom of Bavaria.

During World War II Harvey and Larsen Barracks were both German military bases. The German Air Force used Harvey Barracks for an airport and they would flood the landing strip there when Allied forces would fly overhead. Below Harvey Barracks were multiple levels of hangars which still contain some German World War II aircraft. The hangars were booby-trapped by the retreating Germans close to the end of World War II. Tunnels were said to have been constructed by the Germans from the airfield out to the nearest highway, so that aircraft could be launched off the road to intercept allied planes. Because of the danger involved, no one had been inside the tunnels. In the late 1970s and early 1980s when the 2nd Brigade, Third Infantry Division was located there, private exploration companies offered to descend into those underground hangars and tunnels, but that idea was rejected for safety reasons. Again for safety reasons no one has explored those tunnels since World War II.

During the Cold War, Kitzingen was a staging area for the U.S. European Command's (USAREUR) air defenses against possible Soviet air and nuclear attack. Two U.S. Army Bases, Larson Barracks and Harvey Barracks, were located in the town. For many years it housed the 2nd Brigade of the Third infantry division. One of these battalions, 6-41 Field Artillery, as well as portions of other units including 2 platoons from the 1-15 Infantry Battalion, were deployed to Operation Desert Storm in 1990 and served with distinction. These units were eventually reflagged units of the First infantry division. On March 29, 2007, Larson Barracks and Harvey Barracks were handed back to the German government, with the move of the 1st Infantry Division back to the United States.

Marshall Heights Housing Area contained apartment houses for the majority of the American dependents. It included a commissary (later moved to Harvey Barracks), dependent schools for Grades Kindergarten - 8th Grade, and an AYA (American Youth Activities). High School students rode buses to Wurzburg American High School.

Since January 2007 there have been no more US Army personnel based in Kitzingen. Facilities are closed down and surveillance is discontinued.

Mayors
 Konrad Döppert (CSU, 1946–1948)
 Richard Wildhagen (1948–1952)
 Siegfried Wilke (1952–1958)
 Dr. Oskar Klemmert (1958–1967)
 Rudolf Schardt (SPD, 1967–1991)
 Dr. Erwin Rumpel (CSU, 1991–1997)
 Bernd Moser (SPD, 1997–2008)
 Siegfried Müller (UsW, 2008–2020)
 Stefan Güntner (CSU, since 2020)

Main sights

The town's main landmark is the Leaning Tower, built during the 13th century. It is distinctive for its crooked roof. According to town legend, the tower was being built during a drought, and workers used wine instead of water to make the mortar causing the top of the tower to lean. Today the tower holds a carnival (Fasching) museum.

A local legend is that the golden ball atop the crooked tower contains the heart of Vlad Dracula of Romania. The golden ball leans directly toward a grave in the Kitzingen Old Cemetery located across the street from the tower that is called the Grave of Dracula.

Another local U.S. army legend is the upside down crosses that make up the small windows on the tower, appear right side up when light casts towards the grave yard to ward off vampires. The crosses alternate such that every other one is upside down. Some, however, believe that the grave that is called "Dracula's Grave" is not actually where Vlad Dracula is buried, but rather a heavily decorated grave of a very rich family that resided in Kitzingen.

Twin towns – sister cities

Kitzingen is twinned with:
 Montevarchi, Italy
 Prades, France
 Trzebnica, Poland
 Nalžovské Hory, Czechia

Notable people
 Johann Michael Fehr (1610–1688), doctor and scientist
 Bella Fromm (1890–1972), journalist and writer
 Max Hamburger (1897–1970), lawyer
 Ulf Hoelscher (born 1942), violinist and violin pedagogue
 Fridel Meyer (1904–1982), long-distance kayaker
 Friedrich Spiegel (1820–1905), orientalist
 Konrad Stürtzel (c. 1435–1509), during Maximilian I, Holy Roman Emperor, court chancellor of the  Holy Roman Empire of the German Nation

See also
List of medieval stone bridges in Germany

References

External links

Kitzingen (district)
Populated places on the Main basin
Populated riverside places in Germany